Zülküf Özer (born 10 May 1988) is a Turkish footballer who plays as a goalkeeper for Menemenspor.

References

ZÜLKÜF ÖZER ELAZIĞSPOR’DA!, el-aziz.com, 3 January 2016

External links

1988 births
People from Ergani
Living people
Turkish footballers
Association football defenders
Adanaspor footballers
Elazığspor footballers
Kayseri Erciyesspor footballers
Alanyaspor footballers
Adana Demirspor footballers
Bandırmaspor footballers
Menemenspor footballers
Süper Lig players
TFF First League players
TFF Second League players